James Kim (August 9, 1971December 4, 2006) was an American television personality and technology analyst for the former TechTV international cable television network, reviewing products for shows including The Screen Savers, Call for Help, and Fresh Gear. At the time of his death he was working as a senior editor of MP3 and Digital Audio for CNET, where he wrote more than 400 product reviews. He also co-hosted a weekly video podcast for CNET's gadget blog, Crave, and a weekly audio podcast, The MP3 Insider (both podcasts were co-hosted with Veronica Belmont).

His disappearance and death, and his family's ordeal, made them the subject of a brief, but intense period of news coverage in December 2006.

Early life
Kim graduated from Ballard High School in Louisville, Kentucky, in 1989 and from Oberlin College in Ohio in 1993 where he double-majored in Government and English and played for the varsity lacrosse team. Son of Spencer H. Kim, an aerospace company executive and internationalist, Kim and his wife, Kati, owned two retail stores in San Francisco.

Career
Kim was most widely known as a television personality on the international cable network TechTV, where he was a senior technology analyst for TechTV Labs. He made frequent appearances testing new products for shows including The Screen Savers, Call for Help, Fresh Gear, and AudioFile. He was best known for his "Lab Rats" segments, in which he reviewed the latest electronic gadgets. After leaving TechTV, he became a senior editor for CNET, a technology trade journal, which he had joined in 2004. He wrote product reviews and co-hosted a weekly podcast for CNET's gadget blog, Crave. Prior to working for TechTV, Kim had been a legal assistant at law firms in New York and France; a media relations assistant for baseball's American League; and a script reader for Miramax Films.

Snowbound
After spending the 2006 Thanksgiving holiday in Seattle, Washington, the Kims (James, Kati, and their two daughters, 4-year old Penelope and 7-month old Sabine) set out for their home in San Francisco, California. On Saturday, November 25, 2006, having left Portland, Oregon, on their way to Tu Tu' Tun Lodge, a resort located near Gold Beach, Oregon, the Kims apparently missed a turnoff from Interstate 5 to Oregon Route 42, a main route to the Oregon Coast. Instead of returning to the exit, they consulted a highway map and picked a secondary route along Bear Camp Road that skirted the Wild Rogue Wilderness, a remote area of southwestern Oregon.

After encountering heavy snow at high elevation on Bear Camp Road, they backtracked and ventured onto BLM Road 34-8-36 (North Fork Galice Creek Road), a paved logging road supervised by the Bureau of Land Management (BLM) thinking that could be an option. A road gate intended to prevent such mistakes was open despite BLM rules requiring that it be closed. Media outlets reported that vandals had cut a lock on the gate, but a subsequent investigation showed that BLM employees had left it open to avoid trapping local hunters and others who might have ventured past it.

After 23 miles of slow travel along Road BLM 34-8-36, the family stopped at about 1:00 a.m. on November 26 because of fatigue and bad weather. As more snow fell around their immobilized Saab 9-2X station wagon, the Kims kept warm by running its engine. When the vehicle ran out of fuel, they made a campfire of dried wood and magazines. Later, they burned their car's tires to signal rescuers. Search efforts began shortly after November 30, when coworkers of Kim filed a missing persons report with the San Francisco Police Department. After investigators learned that the Kims used their credit card at a local restaurant, search and rescue teams, including local and state police, more than 80 civilian volunteers, the Oregon Army National Guard and several helicopters hired by Mr. Kim's father, Spencer Kim, spent several days looking for the family along area highways and roads, to no avail.

On December 2, James Kim left his family to look for help, wearing tennis shoes, a jacket, and light clothing. He believed the nearest town (Galice) was located four miles away after studying a map with his wife. He promised his wife he would turn back the same day if he failed to find anyone, but he did not return. Kim backtracked about 11 miles down BLM Road 34-8-36 before leaving the roadway and electing to follow a ravine northeast down the mountain.

Search
Although the Kims had a cellular phone with them, their remote location in the mountains was out of range of the cellular network, rendering the phone unusable for voice calls. Despite being unusable for voice calls, their cell phone would play a key role in their rescue. Cell phone text messages may go through even when there appears to be no signal, in part because text messaging is a store-and-forward service. Two Edge Wireless engineers, Eric Fuqua and Noah Pugsley, contacted search and rescue authorities offering their help in the search. On Saturday, December 2, they began searching through the data logs of cell sites, trying to find records of repeaters to which the Kims' cellphone may have connected. They discovered that on November 26, 2006, at around 1:30 a.m., the Kims' cellphone made a brief automatic connection to a cell site near Glendale, Oregon, and retrieved two text messages. Temporary atmospheric conditions, such as tropospheric ducting, can briefly allow radio communications over larger distances than normal. Through the data logs, the engineers determined that the cell phone was in a specific area west of the cellular tower. They then used a computer program to determine which areas in the mountains were within a line-of-sight to the cellular tower. This narrowed the search area tremendously, and finally focused rescue efforts on Bear Camp Road.

On the afternoon of December 4, John Rachor, a local helicopter pilot unaffiliated with any formal search effort, spotted Mrs. Kim and her two daughters walking on a remote road. After he radioed the family's position to authorities, the three were airlifted out of the area and transferred to a nearby hospital.

Law enforcement officials said that the discovery of the cellphone connection, and the subsequent analysis of the log data, was the critical breakthrough that ultimately resulted in the rescue of Kim's wife and daughters by helicopter.

Death

Officials continued to search for Mr. Kim, at one point finding clothing that he had discarded along the way in the likely belief that he was too hot; paradoxical undressing being one of the symptoms of hypothermia. Optimistic Oregon officials stated, "These were placed with our belief that little signs are being left by James for anyone that may be trying to find him so that they can continue into the area that he's continuing to move in."

On Wednesday, December 6 at 12:03 p.m., Mr. Kim's body was found in Big Windy Creek. Lying on his back in one to two feet of icy water, he was fully clothed and had been carrying a backpack which contained his identification documents, among other miscellaneous items. He had walked about 16.2 miles (26 km) from the car to that point, and was only a mile from Black Bar Lodge, which, although closed for the winter, was fully stocked at the time. An autopsy revealed that Kim had died because of hypothermia and that his body had suffered no incapacitating physical injuries. The medical examiner who performed the autopsy guessed that Kim had died roughly two days after leaving the vehicle.

Route
Because of Mr. Kim's background as a technology analyst, observers speculated that the family had used online mapping to find their route. However, Mrs. Kim told state police that they had used a paper road map, an account supported by the Oregon State Police, which reported that the Kims had used an official State of Oregon highway map. Mrs. Kim later recounted that, after they had been stuck for four days and were studying the map for help, both she and Mr. Kim noticed that a box in the corner of the map bore the message: "Not all Roads Advisable, Check Weather Conditions".

Bear Camp Road is lightly used between October and April, even by local residents, because of its difficult terrain, spotty maintenance, steep drop offs and often inclement weather.
As they drove along the road, the Kims passed three prominent warning signs that state: "Bear Camp Rd. May Be Blocked By Snowdrifts". Mrs. Kim later told police that they had noticed only one warning sign.

Media

The Kim family's ordeal became a lead story on most major U.S. news networks, even amidst breaking news of the Iraq Study Group's recommendations on America's war in Iraq. MSNBC.com reported one million page views on the story, making it the top story in the hours after Kim's body was found. CNN.com reported twice as many page views that afternoon as the Iraq story. Within a week, the Kim family appeared on the cover of People magazine. Newspapers in the region, led by The Oregonian and the San Francisco Chronicle, devoted heavy coverage to the events and their aftermath.

On January 6, 2007, The Washington Post published an op-ed article written by Spencer Kim, James Kim's father, criticizing various government entities that had, in his estimation, played roles in his son's death. The elder Kim blamed the BLM for not locking the gate to the logging road; privacy laws that he claimed had delayed the start of search and rescue efforts; local authorities for "confusion, communication breakdowns and failures of leadership" during the search; and the Federal Aviation Administration for not keeping media aircraft out of the search area.

On February 18, 2007, a memorial service was held for James Kim at Golden Gate Park in San Francisco.

On April 16, 2007, The Oregonian was awarded the 2007 Pulitzer Prize for a distinguished example of local reporting of breaking news, presented in print or online or both, for their coverage of the Kim family story. The staff of The Oregonian was lauded for "its skillful and tenacious coverage of a family missing in the Oregon mountains, telling the tragic story both in print and online".

On September 12, 2007, Kati Kim gave an exclusive interview of the ordeal to UK blogging site DollyMix.

In December 2009, Kati Kim and her daughters made a surprise appearance at a Christmas party being held by the membership of Josephine County Search and Rescue.

In February 2011, the television show 20/20 aired a special 2-hour episode, "The Wrong Turn", which included interviews with Kati Kim.

In September 2011, the television show 20/20 aired a second special 2-hour episode, "The Sixth Sense", which depicted the same story as in "The Wrong Turn".

On August 27, 2017, the television show SOS: How to Survive aired a 1-hour episode, "Trapped in a Blizzard", which depicted the Kim's story with survival tips on how to survive in a similar situation

See also
List of solved missing person cases

References

External links
 Google Earth Community View the area with Google Earth, with waypoints marked includes timeline of events.
 
 
Obituary in the Herald and News

1971 births
2000s missing person cases
2006 deaths
21st-century American non-fiction writers
Accidental deaths in Oregon
American bloggers
American people of Korean descent
American technology writers
Television personalities from San Francisco
Ballard High School (Louisville, Kentucky) alumni
CNET
Deaths from hypothermia
Formerly missing people
Missing person cases in Oregon
Oberlin College alumni
TechTV people
Television personalities from Louisville, Kentucky
Writers from Louisville, Kentucky
Writers from San Francisco
Villanova University alumni